Heliothrips indicus is a species of thrips. It is a pest of millets such as on finger millet, sorghum, and pearl millet in India.

References

Thripidae
Insect pests of millets